Lagonda is an unincorporated community in Chariton County, in the U.S. state of Missouri.

History
A post office called Lagonda was established in 1881, and remained in operation until 1922. The origin of the name Lagonda is obscure.

References

Unincorporated communities in Chariton County, Missouri
Unincorporated communities in Missouri